Jolly is a synonym for "Happy".

Jolly or Jolley may also refer to:

Places
In the United States
 Jolly, Georgia, an unincorporated community
 Jolley, Iowa, a city
 Jolly, Missouri, an unincorporated community
 Jolly, Texas, a city

Elsewhere
 Jolly Creek, British Columbia, Canada
 Jouli or Jolly, Uttar Pradesh, India, a village

People
 Jolley (surname), a list of people surnamed Jolley or Jolly
 Jolly Katongole (born 1985), Ugandan boxer
 Jolly Kramer-Johansen (1902–1968), Norwegian composer
 nickname of Mike Carter (born 1955), American-Israeli basketball player
 nickname of Jack Froggatt (1922-1993), English footballer

Other uses
 Jolly (record company), an Italian company founded in 1958
 Jolly (film), a 1998 Tamil film
 Jolly, aka The Incredible Jolly, an American rock group
 The modified Fiat 600 automobile
 Partenavia Jolly, an Italian two-seat training monoplane
 Jolly Mill, a grist mill in Berwick Township, Missouri; on the National Register of Historic Places

See also
 Jolly Cola, a Danish soft drink
 Jollie, a surname
 Jollie River, New Zealand
 Jolie (disambiguation)
 Joly (disambiguation)